Hubbs' beaked whale (Mesoplodon carlhubbsi) was initially thought to be an Andrews' beaked whale when discovered by ichthyologist Carl Hubbs; however, it was named in his honor when it was discovered to be a new species. This species has the typical dentition found in the genus, but its main outstanding features are a white "cap" on the head and very extensive scarring. The species is known from 31 strandings, a few at-sea sightings, and observations of two stranded whales that were kept in captivity for 16-25 days.

Taxonomy

Carl Leavitt Hubbs, a noted American ichthyologist, published a description of a whale found alive in the surf near his office at the Scripps Institution of Oceanography in La Jolla, California, in 1945. He believed it to be Andrews' beaked whale (a very similar species found only in the Southern Hemisphere), but Joseph Curtis Moore, an expert on beaked whales at Chicago's Field Museum, reassigned it to a new species, Mesoplodon carlhubbsi, in 1963, naming it in his honor.

Description
 
Hubbs’ beaked whale M. carlhubbsi has a light ventral surface and a midventral portion grading from white to medium gray dorsally. The dorsal surface of the flipper is slightly darker than the adjacent thorax in adult females, with a faint light patch on the distal posterior edge. However, the light patch is more noticeable in adult males. The head of adult male M. carlshubbsi is the most striking feature- black with naturally white areas on the tip of the rostrum and anterior to the blowhole. For females, the tip of the rostrum is distinctly lighter than the rest of the head. Males also have a strong pair of teeth protruding from the mandibular symphysis.

Population and distribution
It is estimated M. carlhubbsi are along the coast of Japan and Pacific coast of North America. The distribution along North America extends from San Diego to Prince Rupert. Southern limit is unknown but the northern limit is Vancouver Island. Distribution is probably not directly related to the character of the water mass but rather follows the distribution of the prey species it feeds on. M. carlshubbi follows prey items in intermediate and deep-water masses, rather than surface water masses.

Behavior
Stomach contents of stranded M. carlhubbsi contained squid beaks, fish otoliths, and fish bones. Prey species included Gonatus sp., Chauliodus macouni, Icichthys lockingtoni, and Poromitra crassiceps. Researchers assume calving takes place in the summer based on lengths of neonatal specimens, gestational period, and fetal growth in most cetaceans. On October 3 they found a 90 cm fetus which had about 160 cm of growth before birth which gives an estimated time of birth of about mid-May. A few acoustic and other behavioral observations were made of stranded M. carlhubbsi when they were held briefly in captivity. A stereotyped beaked whale echolocation pulse type (termed BW37V) is thought to be made by this species but has not been linked to a sighting, so this attribution is considered provisional.

Conservation
The species has been occasionally killed by Japanese whalers and has been caught in driftnets off California. Recent strandings in Hawaii have occurred, supporting the theory of open ocean habitation by this species. Threats include fishing and harvesting of aquatic resources, pollution, and climate change. M. carlhubbsi are occasionally taken by Japanese whalers and small cetacean fisheries. Incidental catches in drift gillnets occur sporadically off the coast of California. Climate change and severe weather may cause M. carlhubbsi to shift habitat. Also, as with most beaked whales, they may be vulnerable to loud anthropogenic sounds, especially those generated by navy sonar and seismic exploration.

See also

List of cetaceans

References

Animal diversity web https://animaldiversity.org/accounts/Mesoplodon_carlhubbsi/
Whale and dolphin conservation https://us.whales.org/whales-dolphins/species-guide/hubbs-beaked-whale/
NOAA Olympic Coast National Marine Sanctuary https://olympiccoast.noaa.gov/living/marinelife/mammals/specieslist/spp_hubbsbeaked.html
IUCN Database https://www.iucnredlist.org

Bibliography
Griffiths, E.T., Keating, J.L., Barlow, J. and Moore, J.E. 2019. Description of a new beaked whale echolocation pulse type in the California Current. Marine Mammal Science 35: 1058–1069

Mead, J.G., W.A. Walker, and W.J. Houck. Biological observations on Mesoplodon carlhubbsi (Cetacea: Ziphiidae). Smithsonian Contributions to Zoology. 344

Lynn, S. K. and D. L. Reiss. 1992. Pulse sequence and whistle production by two captive beaked whales, Mesoplodon species. Marine Mammal Science 8:299–305

Taylor, B.L., R. Baird, J. Barlow, S.M. Dawson, J. Ford, J.G. Mead, G. Notarbartolo di Sciara, P. Wade, and R.L. Pitman. 2008. Mesoplodon carlhubbsi. The IUCN Red List of Threatened Species. Available from https://www.iucnredlist.org/species/13243/3425482

External links
Cetaceans of the World
CMS
Whale & Dolphin Conservation Society (WDCS)

Mesoplodont whales
Mammals described in 1963